Mons Aureus may refer to:

 , a former Roman city at the locality of modern Seone, city of Smederevo, Serbia
 , a Serbian magazine

See also 
 , a hill in Smederevo, Serbia